Beragh Red Knigts is a Gaelic Athletic Association club. The club is based in Beragh, County Tyrone, Northern Ireland.

The club concentrates on Gaelic football, a Ladies Gaelic football club is also in existence as is a Handball club and alley called Brackey.

The senior team in 2021 are  competing in Division 2 of the Tyrone All-County Football League and played in the Tyrone Intermediate Football Championship.

Under-14 boys football team completed a Tyrone County treble in 2017 and 2018 winning the Feile, League and Championship

Honours
 Tyrone Intermediate Football Championship
 1993, 2000
 Tyrone Junior Football Championship (1)
 1988

References

External links
 Beragh Red Knights GAC Website

Gaelic games clubs in County Tyrone
Gaelic football clubs in County Tyrone